Russell Donald Freeman (May 28, 1926 – June 27, 2002) was a bebop and cool jazz pianist and composer.

Initially, Freeman was classically trained. His reputation as a jazz pianist grew in the 1940s after working with Art Pepper and Shorty Rogers. He played with Charlie Parker on the 1947 "Home Cooking" jazz session. Numerous collaborations followed in the 1950s with Chet Baker, Shelly Manne, and Art Pepper. These collaborations included the Jazz Immortal LP recorded with Russ Freeman and jazz trumpeter Clifford Brown in 1954, which included leading musicians Brown and Zoot Sims. On the Jazz Immortal LP, Russ Freeman was able to play in a combo that recorded many Clifford Brown compositions.

In 1957, he collaborated with André Previn on the album Double Play!, where they both played piano, accompanied only by Manne on drums.

In 1988, Keith Jarrett performed a  version of Freeman's "The Wind" in a solo concert in Paris, which is featured on his album Paris Concert. In 1991, Mariah Carey wrote her own lyrics to "The Wind" for her album Emotions. Freeman had written "The Wind" with original lyrics by Jerry Gladstone; it had been performed as an instrumental piece during the 1950s and 1960s by the likes of Baker, Leo Wright, and Stan Getz, and had been sung by vocalist June Christy (on The Misty Miss Christy). Freeman's piano is featured on Baker's 1954 recording of "The Wind" (featured on Chet Baker & Strings). Freeman remained busy in music throughout his life, transitioning from jazz pianist to film scoring and composition before his death in Las Vegas in 2002.

Freeman was married three times, and he had one daughter, Paula Kenley Freeman, from his second marriage. He had no grandchildren.
His daughter moved from Seattle to live in the Netherlands in 2009, and an interview about her relationship with her father appeared in the May 2009 issue of the European magazine, PianoWereld.

Discography
With Chet Baker
Chet Baker Sings (Pacific Jazz, 1953)
Grey December (Pacific Jazz, 1953 [1992])
Chet Baker Quartet featuring Russ Freeman (Pacific Jazz, 1953)
Witch Doctor (Contemporary, 1953 [1985])
West Coast Live - with Stan Getz (1954 [1997]) 
Pretty/Groovy (World Pacific, 1953-54 [1958])
The Trumpet Artistry of Chet Baker (Pacific Jazz, 1953–54)
Chet Baker & Strings (Columbia, 1954)
Jazz at Ann Arbor (Pacific Jazz, 1954)
Chet Baker Sings and Plays (Pacific Jazz, 1955)
Quartet: Russ Freeman/Chet Baker (Pacific Jazz, 1956)
With Maynard Ferguson
Maynard Ferguson's Hollywood Party (EmArcy, 1954)
Dimensions (EmArcy, 1955)
With Jimmy Giuffre
Jimmy Giuffre (Capitol, 1955)
With Irene Kral
Wonderful Life (Mainstream, 1965)
With Shelly Manne
"The Three" & "The Two" (Contemporary, 1954 [1960]) - compilation of previously issued 10-inch LPs
The West Coast Sound (Contemporary, 1955)
Shelly Manne & Russ Freeman (Contemporary, 1955)
Swinging Sounds (Contemporary, 1956)
More Swinging Sounds (Contemporary, 1956)
Concerto for Clarinet & Combo (Contemporary, 1957)
The Gambit (Contemporary, 1958)
Shelly Manne & His Men Play Peter Gunn (Contemporary, 1959)
Ruth Price with Shelly Manne & His Men at the Manne-Hole (Contemporary, 1961) with Ruth Price
Live! Shelly Manne & His Men at the Manne-Hole (Contemporary, 1961)
Shelly Manne & His Men Play Checkmate (Contemporary, 1961)
My Fair Lady with the Un-original Cast (Capitol, 1964)
Manne–That's Gershwin! (Capitol, 1965)
Boss Sounds! (Atlantic, 1966)
One on One (Atlas, 1982)
With Jack Montrose
Arranged by Montrose (Pacific Jazz, 1954)
With Art Pepper
Surf Ride (Savoy, 1952-1954 [1956])
The Return of Art Pepper (Jazz: West, 1956)
The Art Pepper Quartet (Tampa, 1956)
Modern Art (Intro, 1957)
Mucho Calor (Andex, 1957) with Conte Candoli
Among Friends (Interplay, 1978)
With André Previn
Double Play! (Contemporary, 1957)
The Subterraneans (Soundtrack) (MGM, 1960)
With Pete Rugolo
Rugolomania (Columbia, 1955)
New Sounds by Pete Rugolo (Harmony, 1954–55, [1957])
Music for Hi-Fi Bugs (EmArcy, 1956)
Out on a Limb (EmArcy, 1956)
An Adventure in Sound: Brass in Hi-Fi (Mercury 1956 [1958])
10 Trombones Like 2 Pianos (Mercury, 1960)

References

External links

Biography of Russ Freeman by John Fordham at guardian.co.uk
Biography of Russ Freeman by Jon Thurber at latimes.com
Part 1 of Profile of Russ Freeman by Steven Cerra at jazzprofiles.blogspot.com
Part 2 of Profile of Russ Freeman by Steven Cerra at jazzprofiles.blogspot.com
Biography of Russ Freeman by John Fordham at All About Jazz
Article about Russ Freeman's composition, "The Wind," by James Harrod at Jazz West Coast Research

Bebop pianists
Cool jazz pianists
American jazz pianists
American male pianists
West Coast jazz pianists
Jazz musicians from Illinois
1926 births
2002 deaths
Musicians from Chicago
20th-century American pianists
20th-century American male musicians
American male jazz musicians
The Tonight Show Band members